Achanak - 37 Saal Baad (English: All of a sudden - after 37 years) is an Indian supernatural and Psychological thriller television serial telecast on Sony Entertainment Television between 2002 and 2003. The centerpiece of this serial was the little known small town of Gahota, which experienced paranormal activities after each cycle of 37 years. It was first aired on 22 March 2002.

Plot
Strange things happen in Gahota every 37 years causing a strange hysteria in people and leading them to kill others or themselves and not remembering anything once the cycle is over in a few months. Gahota is controlled by the devil's henchman, Ajay, who has been granted the ability to control the minds of people in Gahota by the devil himself.

Preparing for the devil's birth, Ajay removes anyone who comes in the way by murdering the person. Eventually, the devil is born in the form of Rahul/Ajinkya. Ajay encourages the young Rahul to recall his powers and true purpose since Rahul has grown up as a normal, kind human being oblivious of his powers. Rahul finally transforms into Ajinkya, who promptly kills Ajay as he is no longer needed. Later, Ajay comes back to life and joins the reincarnated others to facilitate Ajinkya's birth, to defeat and kill Ajinkya.

Cast 
 Rahil Azam as Rahul/Ajinkya 
 Faraaz Khan as Ajay/Professor Joydeb
 Iravati Harshe as Sheela
 Shishir Sharma as Pratap
 Rajendranath Zutshi as Dipankar Ray
 Ravindra Mankani as Avinash
 Ashwini Kalsekar as Malini 
 Aashka Goradia as Kamal
 Zafar Karachiwala as Ratan
 Sunita Rajwar as Ajinkya's evil baby sitter
 Shruti Ulfat as Rupali
 Tannaz Irani as Naina
 Neha Mehta as Anjali
  Rituraj Singh as Shashank
 Akshay Anand 
 Nishigandha Wad
 Kamya Punjabi as Reshmi
 Rushali Arora as Sunidhi

Awards 
Indian Telly award for Best horror programme of the year in 2003.

References 

Psychological thriller television series
2000s Indian television series
Indian thriller television series